Misia Candle Night 2015 was a concert tour by Japanese singer Misia and the fourth installment of the Misia Candle Night concert series. The tour started with two back-to-back dates at Kawaguchiko Stellar Theater in Fujikawaguchiko, Yamanashi on September 21-22, 2015, and concluded with two consecutive dates at the World Heritage Site Mount Kōya in Kōya, Wakayama, held as part of the World Heritage Theater project to celebrate the temple's 1200th anniversary, on October 10-11, 2015.

Background
On June 30, 2015, Misia announced she would be hosting a four-date installment of the Misia Candle Night concert series starting in September 2015. On September 18, 2015, it was announced that all pre-sale tickets for the first two shows had sold out. The charity Candle Night Bar stand at the concert venue raised a total of 301,059 yen for both Kawaguchiko Stellar Theater shows combined. Proceeds after expenses benefited the non-profit Mudef.

Set list
This set list is representative of the concert on September 21, 2015. It does not represent all concerts for the duration of the tour.

"Anata ni Smile :)"
"Mayonaka no Hide-and-seek" ("Midnight Hide-and-seek")
"Chandelier"
"Nocturne" (Strings Off)
"Koi Gram" ("Love Gram")
"Sukoshi Zutsu Taisetsu ni"
"Shiroi Kisetsu" (Piano & Strings version)
"Hana" ("Flower") (Strings Off)
"Jewelry"
"Orphans no Namida"
"Deepness"
"Kokoro Hitotsu"
"Nagareboshi"
"Candle of Life"
Encore
"Boku wa Pegasus Kimi wa Polaris"
"Ashita e"

Shows

Personnel
Band
 Misia – lead vocals
 Tohru Shigemi – keyboard
 Shūhei Yamaguchi – guitar
 Satoshi Yoshida - guitar
 Jino – bass
 Tomo Kanno – drums
 Akio Suzuki - sax, flute
 Hanah Spring - backing vocals
 Lyn - backing vocals
 Gen Ittetsu, Maki Cameroun, Mori Takuya, Masami Horisawa - strings

References

External links
 

2015 concert tours
Misia concert tours
Concert tours of Japan